Shiromizu Dam is a gravity dam located in Yamagata Prefecture in Japan. The dam is used for flood control and irrigation. The catchment area of the dam is 15.2 km2. The dam impounds about 30  ha of land when full and can store 5300 thousand cubic meters of water. The construction of the dam was started on 1974 and completed in 1990.

References

Dams in Yamagata Prefecture
1990 establishments in Japan